Map Rock Petroglyphs Historic District in Canyon County, Idaho, is an archaeological site that includes petroglyphs believed to have been made by Northern Shoshone prior to contact with the 19th century Westward expansion of settlers in Idaho.

Map Rock
The historic district is named for Map Rock, a massive basalt rock covered in petroglyphs, named by Robert Limbert in the early 1920s. Limbert believed that the rock depicts a map of the Snake River valley, and some authors have suggested that if it is a map then it may be the oldest map in the world.

In 1924 a plan emerged either to move Map Rock to Boise or to cut the rock and move pieces to Boise to become a feature of the State Capitol grounds. Although the plan soon was abandoned, the rock was found to have sustained damage.

Map Rock and the surrounding 38 acres were acquired by Canyon County in 2012.

References

External links
 *  With 
 Shoshone Map Rock, Northern Shoshone and Bannock Tribes
 Yu, Pei-Lin, Ethnographic and Archaeological Reference Knowledge for Cupule/Pit and Groove Boulders, (Boise State University Anthropology, 2016)

Further reading
 Erwin, R. P., "Indian Rock Writing in Idaho," Twelfth Biennial Report of the State Historical Society of Idaho for the Years 1929-30 (1930), pp 2, 35-111
 Zuhlke, Don, The Map Rock of Idaho Decoded, (CreateSpace, 2016)

		
National Register of Historic Places in Canyon County, Idaho
Canyon County, Idaho